Jama Mosque is one of the biggest mosque in Himachal Pradesh located in Kotwali Bazar, Dharamshala, India.

History
The Jama Masjid in Dharamsala was built by Janab Ghulam Rasool in the year 1719 AD. The 1905 Kangra earthquake damaged the mosque and its dome. At that time, Ahle Islam committee took charge and renovated the damaged part of the mosque and people started offering prayers regularly.

Between 1947 and 1995, there was only one mosque in Yol cantonment where Salat-ul-jumuah (community prayer offered once a week at noon on every Friday) and Salatul Eieden prayers was organized. In 1995, the mosque Aman-e- Awam welfare committee was established and salah (obligatory five times prayer) continued in this mosque. In the same year, Imam Muhammad Kamil Jamie Sb was appointed and he continues to be the Imam of the mosque.

References

Mosques in Himachal Pradesh
Buildings and structures in Dharamshala
Religious buildings and structures completed in 1719
1719 establishments in Asia